Charles Stanley is a United Kingdom investment management company. Established in 1792, it was - at the time of its acquisition by Raymond James Financial - one of the oldest firms on the London Stock Exchange. It provides wealth management services to private clients, charities and smaller institutions.

History
A subsidiary of the group, Charles Stanley & Co. Ltd., was first listed on the London Stock Exchange in 1852. The Charles Stanley Group itself was incorporated and listed in 1896. The Group offers four core services: wealth management, financial planning, an award-winning online execution only platform and asset management.

Operations
As of 31 March 2019, it has £24.1 billion of investments under management and administration.

The group's board of directors is chaired by David Howard, who was appointed to the position in 1999. He stepped down as group chief executive in 2014. Paul Abberley replaced Howard as chief executive in December 2014. 

In 2019, Charles Stanley reported revenues of £155.2 million.

In July 2021, the company was sold to Raymond James Financial for £279 million.

References

External links

Financial services companies based in London
Investment management companies of the United Kingdom
Companies listed on the London Stock Exchange
Financial services companies established in 1792
1792 establishments in England